Camponotus rufoglaucus is a species of carpenter ant (genus Camponotus). It is found from many Afrotropical, Indo-Australian, Oriental, Palaearctic regional countries.

Subspecies
Camponotus rufoglaucus controversus Santschi, 1916 - Tanzania
Camponotus rufoglaucus feae Emery, 1882 - Canary Islands
Camponotus rufoglaucus latericius Stitz, 1923 - Namibia
Camponotus rufoglaucus rufoglaucus Jerdon, 1851 - India, Sri Lanka, Kenya, Namibia, Rwanda, Zimbabwe, Borneo, Bangladesh, Cambodia, Thailand, Vietnam, Nepal, Canary Islands, China
Camponotus rufoglaucus syphax Wheeler, W.M., 1922 - Democratic Republic of Congo
Camponotus rufoglaucus tenuis Forel, 1907 - India
Camponotus rufoglaucus zanzibaricus Forel, 1911 - Tanzania
Camponotus rufoglaucus zulu Emery, 1895 - South Africa
Source:

Gallery

References

External links

 at antwiki.org
Itis.gov
Animaldiversity.org

rufoglaucus
Hymenoptera of Asia
Insects described in 1851